Mark Krzykowski (born c. 1970) is an American college athletics administrator and former college football coach. He is an assistant athletic director at Carroll University in Waukesha, Wisconsin, a position he has held since November 2019. Krzykowski served as the head football coach at Carroll from 2011 to 2019. He was named the head football coach at Carroll the 2011 season, replacing Henny Hiemenz who resigned in 2010.

Head coaching record

References

External links
 Carroll profile

1970s births
Living people
Carroll Pioneers football coaches
Carroll Pioneers football players
Elmhurst Bluejays football coaches